John A. Bryant is an Australian businessman.  Bryant was the chairman and chief executive officer of Kellogg Company (Kellogg's) since January 2011. His retirement from the company was announced in September 2017.

Early life

Born in Brisbane, Queensland, Bryant attended St Edmund's College in Canberra, Australian Capital Territory (ACT).

Bryant received a Bachelor of Commerce from Australian National University in 1987, and received an MBA from the Wharton School of the University of Pennsylvania.

Career

Bryant joined Kellogg Company in 1998, and has held a variety of roles, including chief financial officer (CFO); president, North America; president, international; and chief operating officer (COO).

In July 2010, Bryant joined the Kellogg Company's board of directors.

In January 2011, Bryant was named president and CEO.

In July 2014, Bryant was named chairman of the Board of Kellogg Company. In this role, he also chairs the executive committee of the board.

Bryant serves as a trustee of the W.K. Kellogg Foundation Trust. He also serves on the board of directors of Catalyst, The Consumer Goods Forum, and Macy's, Inc.

Bryant is a Chartered Accountant of the Institute of Chartered Accountants in Australia.

Kellogg Company
In 2012, Bryant was sanguine about the purchase of Pringles from Procter & Gamble, after a deal with Diamond Foods fell through.

Bryant has admitted to firing too many employees in the United States during the 2007–2012 global economic crisis.

On September 28, 2017, the company announced Bryant would retire in the first week of October. Steven Cahillane will succeed Bryant. According to Kellogg spokesperson Kris Charles, as reported by Fortune, it was Bryant's decision to retire. Bryant will stay on as executive chairman until March 15.

Personal life

Bryant lives in Kalamazoo, Michigan, with his wife Alison and their six children.

References

Businesspeople from Brisbane
Australian National University alumni
Wharton School of the University of Pennsylvania alumni
Australian chief executives
People from Kalamazoo, Michigan
Kellogg's
Chief operating officers
American chief financial officers
American chief executives of manufacturing companies
American chief executives of food industry companies
Living people
Year of birth missing (living people)